The Pacific Coast League Pitcher of the Year Award is an annual award given to the best pitcher in Minor League Baseball's Pacific Coast League based on their regular-season performance as voted on by league managers. Broadcasters, Minor League Baseball executives, and members of the media have previously voted as well. Though the league was established in 1903, the award was not created until 1957. It was issued sporadically through 1974 before being discontinued from 1975 to 2000. After the cancellation of the 2020 season, the league was known as the Triple-A West in 2021 before reverting to the Pacific Coast League name in 2022.

From 1927 to 2000, pitchers were eligible to win the Most Valuable Player Award (MVP). Eleven pitchers won the MVP Award: Bobo Newsom (1933), Willie Ludolph (1936), Fred Hutchinson (1938), Yank Terry (1941), Bob Joyce (1945), Johnny Lindell (1952), Dick Hall (1959), Dennis Lewallyn (1980), Mike Campbell (1987), Donne Wall (1995), and Steve Mintz (1996). Five pitchers have also won the league's Top MLB Prospect Award (formerly the Rookie of the Year Award): George O'Donnell (1953), Lino Donoso (1954), Bob Garber (1955), Bob Anderson (1956), and Félix Hernández (2005). Hernández is the only pitcher to win both awards in the same season. Charlie Hough, the winner in 1970 and 1972, is the only pitcher to win the award on multiple occasions.

Five pitchers from the Tacoma Rainiers have been selected for the Pitcher of the Year Award, more than any other team in the league, followed by the Nashville Sounds and Oklahoma City Dodgers (3); the Albuquerque Dukes, Iowa Cubs, Round Rock Express, and Sugar Land Space Cowboys (2); and the Albuquerque Isotopes, Denver Bears, Edmonton Trappers, Fresno Grizzlies, Hawaii Islanders, Memphis Redbirds, New Orleans Zephyrs, Omaha Storm Chasers, Phoenix Giants, Sacramento River Cats, Salt Lake Bees, San Francisco Seals, Spokane Indians, and Vancouver Mounties (1).

Seven players from the Houston Astros Major League Baseball (MLB) organization have won the award, more than any other, followed by the Los Angeles Dodgers organization (5); the Chicago Cubs organization (4); the Milwaukee Brewers organization (3); the Los Angeles Angels, San Francisco Giants, and Seattle Mariners organizations (2); and the Baltimore Orioles, Boston Red Sox, Kansas City Royals, Minnesota Twins, Oakland Athletics, St. Louis Cardinals, Texas Rangers, and Washington Nationals organizations (1).

Winners

Wins by team

Active Pacific Coast League teams appear in bold.

Wins by organization

Active Pacific Coast League–Major League Baseball affiliations appear in bold.

References
Specific

General

Awards established in 1957
Minor league baseball trophies and awards
Pacific Coast League